The 1930–31 Detroit Falcons season was the Detroit National Hockey League (NHL) franchise's fifth season of play and the first known as the Detroit Falcons. The Falcons missed the playoffs

Offseason

Regular season

Final standings

Record vs. opponents

Schedule and results

Playoffs

Player statistics

Regular season
Scoring

Goaltending

Note: GP = Games played; G = Goals; A = Assists; Pts = Points; PIM = Penalty minutes; PPG = Power-play goals; SHG = Short-handed goals; GWG = Game-winning goals
      MIN = Minutes played; W = Wins; L = Losses; T = Ties; GA = Goals against; GAA = Goals-against average;  SO = Shutouts;

Awards and records

Transactions

See also
1930–31 NHL season

References

External links

Detroit Red Wings seasons
Detroit
Detroit
Detroit Falcons
Detroit Falcons